Matthew Lochhead (19 August 1884 – 1964) was a Scottish professional footballer who played as a centre half in the Southern League for Swindon Town. He also played in the Scottish League and the Football League.

Personal life 
Lochhead served as a company sergeant major in the Royal Scots Fusiliers during the First World War.

Career statistics

References

Scottish footballers
Association football central defenders
English Football League players
1884 births
1964 deaths
Date of death missing
Place of death missing
People from Anderston
Footballers from Glasgow 
Scottish Football League players
Southern Football League players
Beith F.C. players
St Mirren F.C. players
Leicester City F.C. players
Manchester City F.C. players
Heart of Midlothian F.C. wartime guest players
Clyde F.C. wartime guest players
Swindon Town F.C. players
Bath City F.C. players
Reading F.C. players
British Army personnel of World War I
Royal Scots Fusiliers soldiers